The yeast mitochondrial code (translation table 3) is a genetic code used by the mitochondrial genome of yeasts, notably Saccharomyces cerevisiae, Candida glabrata, Hansenula saturnus, and Kluyveromyces thermotolerans.

The code

   AAs  = FFLLSSSSYY**CCWWTTTTPPPPHHQQRRRRIIMMTTTTNNKKSSRRVVVVAAAADDEEGGGG
Starts = ---M---------------M---------------M---------------M------------
 Base1 = TTTTTTTTTTTTTTTTCCCCCCCCCCCCCCCCAAAAAAAAAAAAAAAAGGGGGGGGGGGGGGGG
 Base2 = TTTTCCCCAAAAGGGGTTTTCCCCAAAAGGGGTTTTCCCCAAAAGGGGTTTTCCCCAAAAGGGG
 Base3 = TCAGTCAGTCAGTCAGTCAGTCAGTCAGTCAGTCAGTCAGTCAGTCAGTCAGTCAGTCAGTCAG

Bases: adenine (A), cytosine (C), guanine (G) and thymine (T) or uracil (U).

Amino acids: Alanine (Ala, A), Arginine (Arg, R), Asparagine (Asn, N), Aspartic acid (Asp, D), Cysteine (Cys, C), Glutamic acid (Glu, E), Glutamine (Gln, Q), Glycine (Gly, G), Histidine (His, H), Isoleucine (Ile, I), Leucine (Leu, L), Lysine (Lys, K), Methionine (Met, M), Phenylalanine (Phe, F), Proline (Pro, P), Serine (Ser, S), Threonine (Thr, T), Tryptophan (Trp, W), Tyrosine (Tyr, Y), Valine (Val, V).

Differences from the standard code

 The remaining CGN codons are rare in Saccharomyces cerevisiae and absent in Candida glabrata. 
 The AUA codon is common in the gene var1 coding for the single mitochondrial ribosomal protein, but rare in genes encoding the enzymes.
 The coding assignments of the AUA (Met or Ile) and CUU (possibly Leu, not Thr) are uncertain in Hansenula saturnus.
 The coding assignment of Thr to CUN is uncertain in Kluyveromyces thermotolerans.

See also 
 List of genetic codes

References

Molecular genetics
Gene expression
Protein biosynthesis